Hooshang Talé is an Iranian pan-Iranist politician who served as a member of parliament from 1967 to 1971, representing Rudsar. He was an expert at economics bureau of the Planning Organisation of Iran and holds a PhD in political science and economics , obtained from University of Graz in Austria.

Bibliography 
 Iran in the Claws of the Bear: The Failed Soviet Landgrab of 1946 (2007)

References 

1933 births
Living people
Pan-Iranist Party politicians
People from Tehran
Members of the 22nd Iranian Majlis
Iranian nationalists